Carl Adolf "Ale" Andersson (23 June 1888 – 23 November 1974) was a Swedish freestyle swimmer. He competed at the 1908 Summer Olympics in the 200 m and in 4 × 200 m events, but failed to reach the finals. His younger brothers Erik and Robert were Olympic water polo players, while sister Selma was an Olympic diver.

References

1888 births
1985 deaths
Olympic swimmers of Sweden
Swimmers at the 1908 Summer Olympics
Swimmers from Stockholm
Swedish male freestyle swimmers
Stockholms KK swimmers